Nespoli is an Italian surname. Notable people with the surname include:

Gian Luigi Nespoli (1936–2007), Italian-born Cuban poet and writer
Mauro Nespoli (born 1987), Italian archer
Paolo Nespoli (born 1957), Italian astronaut and engineer
Uriel Nespoli (1884–1973), Italian conductor

See also
12405 Nespoli, a main-belt asteroid

Italian-language surnames